The Irma  was a steamship which sank on July 14, 1911 at Port Limón, Costa Rica after a collision with the Steamship Diamante. Loss of life approximately 39 (32 passengers and 7 crew- Warren Evening Mirror) . The accident occurred in the estuary of the St. John river where both vessels were maneuvering during a violent storm. The accident occurred at 8:00 p.m. local time. The Diamante's bow struck the Irma's midship forcing her nose deep inside the Irma's hull The Irma was en route to Greytown               .

References 
 "Many Passengers Drown" , The Gleamer,Kingston, Jamaica,  July 22, 1911, p. 5
 "Two Steamers in Collision" Warren Evening Mirror, Warren, Pennsylvania, July 15, 1911, p. 8
 "50 Drown in Crash", The Washington Post, July 15, 1911, p. 1

References

Shipwrecks of Costa Rica
Maritime incidents in 1911
Steamships